Thomas Kane Roberts (born April 15, 1962) is an American retired voice actor. He is best known for his work in animation and video games, most notably the Star Wars franchise.

Career
Kane began his voice-over career in 1977, at fifteen years old. He is known for his animation work throughout his career, including Jedi Master Yoda and Admiral Yularen in Star Wars: The Clone Wars feature film and TV series, The Chancellor in 9, Magneto in Wolverine and the X-Men and Marvel vs Capcom 3: Fate of Two Worlds, Ultron in Next Avengers: Heroes of Tomorrow and The Avengers: Earth's Mightiest Heroes, Mr. Herriman in Foster's Home for Imaginary Friends, Lord Monkey Fist on Kim Possible, Professor Utonium and HIM in The Powerpuff Girls. He has voiced Oxnard Montalvo in The Angry Beavers and the chimpanzee sidekick Darwin in The Wild Thornberrys.

Kane was also a prominent video game voice actor, appearing in numerous titles - from bit parts, to major roles such as Gandalf, Professor X and lead characters in many Star Wars games like Star Wars: The Force Unleashed as Imperial Captain Ozzik Sturn, Lobot and Kento Marek (the father of Sam Witwer's Galen Marek) thanks to ILM's motion capture technology. In Call of Duty: World at War, Black Ops, Black Ops II, Black Ops III and Black Ops IIII, he provides the voice of Takeo Masaki, a Japanese WWII soldier and WWI warrior in the Zombies game mode.

In the arena of non-animation voiceover work, Kane recorded commercials, film trailers and television promos. In addition, he has been the announcer for the AFI Life Achievement Award show twice, as well as the 78th, 80th, 83rd, 84th, and 90th Academy Awards. He also played Odin (the father of Thor and Loki) in the video game adaption of Thor as well as the Disneyland attraction: Thor: Treasures of Asgard, taking over the role from Anthony Hopkins from the film.

On April 13, 2012, Kane took over for Joe Hursh as the voice of the Walt Disney World Monorail System. In 2013, he took over as the announcer of The Eric Andre Show, replacing Gary Anthony Williams.

Kane made his debut in the Star Wars film saga as the voice of Admiral Ackbar in 2017's Star Wars: The Last Jedi, taking over the role from the late Erik Bauersfeld. He had experience in voicing the character on several occasions for video games in the franchise prior to the film's release. He also voiced Plague Champion in Warhammer 40,000: Dawn of War II - Chaos Rising and Retribution. 

During the COVID-19 pandemic, Kane was one of several voices for health and safety announcements at Walt Disney World. He also narrated the series premiere of Star Wars: The Bad Batch in May 2021.

Retirement
In November 2020, Kane suffered a stroke which left him with weakness on the right side of his body and damage to his speaking, writing, and reading abilities. In September 2021, his daughter Sam confirmed that, due to his stroke, he had decided to officially enter an early retirement from voice acting.

Personal life
Kane has been married to Cindy Roberts since 1981 and is the father of 9 children including a daughter named Sam who began giving regular updates on his condition after his stroke on Facebook.

Filmography

Voice acting

Film

Television

Video games

Live-action

Film

Television

Awards and nominations

References

External links

1962 births
20th-century American male actors
21st-century American male actors
American male television actors
American male voice actors
American male video game actors
Audiobook narrators
Cartoon Network people
Living people
University of Kansas alumni
People from Overland Park, Kansas
Male actors from Kansas